Aayi Mandapam (Park Monument. French: Monument du parc) is a white monument in Pondicherry, India built during the time of Napoleon III, Emperor of France. It is situated in center of Bharati Park. The monument commemorates the provision of water to the French city during his reign. It was named after a lady courtesan named Āyi. She destroyed her own house to erect a water reservoir to supply water for the city.

External links 
Aayi Mandapam Photo

Buildings and structures in Pondicherry (city)